This is a list of the first minority male lawyer(s) and judge(s) in Colorado. It includes the year in which the men were admitted to practice law (in parentheses). Also included are other distinctions such as the first minority men in their state to graduate from law school or become a political figure.

Firsts in Colorado's history

State judges 

 First African American male: James C. Flanigan in 1957 
 First Hispanic American male (district court): Don Pacheco in 1971 
 First Hispanic American male (Supreme Court of Colorado): Luis Rovira in 1979 
 First Latino American male (Colorado Court of Appeals): Jose D.L. Marquez (1970) in 1988
 First African American male (18th Judicial District): Robert Russell: 
 First Hispanic American male (Chief Justice; Supreme Court of Colorado): Luis Rovira in 1990 
 First African American male (Colorado Supreme Court): Gregory Kellam Scott in 1992:
 First openly gay male (district court): David Brett Woods in 2009 
 First Latino American male (Chief Judge; Colorado Court of Appeals): Gilbert M. Román in 2021

Federal judges 
First African American male (U.S. District Court for the District of Colorado): Wiley Young Daniel (1971) in 1995  
First Hispanic American male (U.S. Court of Appeals for the Tenth Circuit): Carlos F. Lucero (1964) in 1995

Attorney General of Colorado 

 First Hispanic American male: Ken Salazar (1981) from 1999-2005

United States Attorney 

 First Hispanic American male (U.S. Attorney for the District of Colorado): Charles S. Vigil in 1951

District Attorney 

 First African American male: Norman S. Early, Jr. in 1983

Colorado Bar Association 

First African American male admitted: Edwin Henry Hackley (1883)
First Hispanic American male (president): Carlos F. Lucero (1964) from 1977-1978 
First African American male (president): Wiley Young Daniel (1971) in 1991

Firsts in local history 
 Madoche Jean: First African American male judge in the 17th Judicial District [Adams County, Colorado; 2020]
 James C. Flanigan: First African American male to serve as a Deputy District Attorney and municipal court judge in Denver, Colorado
Norman S. Early, Jr.: First African American male to serve as the District Attorney for Denver, Colorado (1983) [Denver County, Colorado]
Gilbert Gutierrez: First Latino American male to serve on the Weld County District Court, Colorado (1997)

See also 

 List of first minority male lawyers and judges in the United States

Other topics of interest 

 List of first women lawyers and judges in the United States
 List of first women lawyers and judges in Colorado

References 

 
Minority, Colorado, first
Minority, Colorado, first
Lists of people from Colorado
Colorado lawyers
law